Şcoala Moldovenească was a magazine from Chişinău, Bessarabia, founded in May 1917 by Onisifor Ghibu. It was the successor of Cuvânt moldovenesc

References

Bibliography 
 Georgeta Răduică, Dicţionarul presei româneşti (1731–1918), Editura Ştiinţifică, București,

External links
 PRESA BASARABEANĂ de la începuturi pînă în anul 1957. Catalog

Bessarabia Governorate
Defunct magazines published in Russia
Defunct literary magazines published in Europe
Magazines established in 1917
Magazines disestablished in 1918
Mass media in Chișinău
Literary magazines published in Moldova
Romanian-language magazines
1917 establishments in Russia
1918 disestablishments in Russia